The list of fish of the Black Sea consists of indigenous, and also introduced species.

The following tags are used to indicate the conservation status of species by IUCN's criteria:

All the listed species are classified by their origin as native, introduced, invasive, and species found accidentally (difficult to characterize as native or invasive).

See also
 List of fish of the Mediterranean Sea
 List of fish of the North Sea
 List of fish in Ukraine

References
 Aleksandrov, A. I., 1927: Anchois de la mer d'Azoff et de la mer Noire, leurs origine et indications taxonomiques. Reports of the Scientific Station of Fisheries in Kertch v. 1 (2–3): 37–99.
 Kessler, K. T., 1860: A zoological voyage to the northern coast of the Black Sea and Crimea in 1858. Kyiv: 1–248, Pls. 1–2.
 Murgoci, A. A., 1940: Étude sur quelques espèces du genre Lepadogaster de la mer Noire. Comptes Rendus des Séances de l'Institut des Sciences de Roumanie, ancienne Académie des Sciences de Roumanie, Bucharest. v. 4 (núms. 5–6): 380–386.
 Murgoci, A. A., 1964: Contribution à la connaissance des gobiesocides (ordre des Xenopterygii) de la Mer Noire. Revue Roumaine de Biologie Serie de Zoologie v. 9 (núm. 5): 297–306.
 Pavlov, P. I., 1959: The clupeid genus Alosa in the northwestern part of the Black Sea. Inst. Akad. Nauk. USSR, Kyiv: 252 pp.
 Slastenenko, E. P., 1935: The scorpionfishes Scorpaena of the Black Sea. Doklady Akademii Nauk SSSR, v. 1: 74–80.
 Slastenenko, E. P., 1938: Les Poissons de la Mer Noire et de la Mer d'Azov. Annales scientifiques de l'Université de Jassy v. 25 (pt 2, núm. 1): 1–196.
 Slastenenko, E. P., 1955-1956: The fishes of the Black Sea Basin. The fishes of the Black Sea Basin.: 1–711.
 Мовчан Ю.В. (2011) Риби України, Київ, 420 с.
 Васильева Е. Д. Рыбы Черного моря. — Москва: Изд-во ВНИРО, 2007. — 238 с.
 Ковтун O.A. (2012) Первая находка бычка Gammogobius steinitzi Bath, 1971 (Actinopterygii, Perciformes, Gobiidae) в морских подводных пещерах западного Крыма (Чёрное море) (Предварительное сообщение). Морський екологічний журнал, 3(11): 56.
 Yankova M., Pavlov D., Ivanova P., Karpova E., Boltachev A., Öztürk B., Bat L., Oral M., Mgeladze M. (2014) Marine fihes in the Black Sea: recent conservation status. Mediterranean Marine Science, 15(2): 366–379.

Links
 Web Products: Large Marine Ecosystems – Black Sea
 Fish catch in the Black Sea over the last 30 years, Turkey and USSR
 Black Sea Fisheries
 Fishing 'destabilises Black Sea'
 Artüz M.L. (1999) INVENTORY OF EXISTING SPECIES AND THEIR HABITATS IN THE BOSPHORUS AREA. Marine bio abs., 1: 112–023.
 
 Black Sea Fishes Check List


'
'
'
'
Black Sea
Black Sea